Lingle is a town in Goshen County, Wyoming, United States. The population was 468 at the 2010 census.

Former Wyoming Supreme Court Justice Richard V. Thomas was reared in Lingle.

Geography
Lingle is located at  (42.137494, -104.346500).

History
On July 1, 2022, a canal near the town was breached. This canal breach caused the National Weather Service to issue four flash flood emergencies for the town.

Demographics

2010 census
As of the census of 2010, there were 468 people, 204 households, and 138 families living in the town. The racial makeup of the town was 97.4% White, 0.2% African American, 0.4% Native American, 1.3% from other races, and 0.6% from two or more races. Hispanic or Latino of any race were 3.0% of the population.

There were 204 households, of which 30.4% had children under the age of 18 living with them, 55.4% were married couples living together, 10.8% had a female householder with no husband present, 1.5% had a male householder with no wife present, and 32.4% were non-families. 30.4% of all households were made up of individuals, and 13.7% had someone living alone who was 65 years of age or older. The average household size was 2.29 and the average family size was 2.82.

The median age in the town was 43.9 years. 24.1% of residents were under the age of 18; 6.4% were between the ages of 18 and 24; 20.3% were from 25 to 44; 29.9% were from 45 to 64; and 19.2% were 65 years of age or older. The gender makeup of the town was 43.6% male and 56.4% female.

2000 census
As of the census of 2000, there were 510 people, 210 households, and 140 families living in the town. The population density was 1,653.6 people per square mile (635.2/km2). There were 234 housing units at an average density of 758.7 per square mile (291.4/km2). The racial makeup of the town was 96.67% White, 0.20% Pacific Islander, 1.57% from other races, and 1.57% from two or more races. Hispanic or Latino of any race were 4.12% of the population.

There were 210 households, out of which 28.1% had children under the age of 18 living with them, 57.6% were married couples living together, 6.2% had a female householder with no husband present, and 32.9% were non-families. 28.6% of all households were made up of individuals, and 11.4% had someone living alone who was 65 years of age or older. The average household size was 2.43 and the average family size was 2.98.

In the town, the population was spread out, with 26.7% under the age of 18, 6.1% from 18 to 24, 26.1% from 25 to 44, 24.3% from 45 to 64, and 16.9% who were 65 years of age or older. The median age was 40 years. For every 100 females, there were 93.9 males. For every 100 females age 18 and over, there were 98.9 males.

The median income for a household in the town was $33,235, and the median income for a family was $38,036. Males had a median income of $30,313 versus $22,500 for females. The per capita income for the town was $16,559. About 4.0% of families and 9.4% of the population were below the poverty line, including 4.7% of those under age 18 and 13.2% of those age 65 or over.

Education
Public education in the town of Lingle is provided by Goshen County School District #1.

Highways
 U.S. Highway 26
 U.S. Highway 85

Notable people
Jerry Hill (American football) (born 1939), NFL running back for the Baltimore Colts
Bill Nation (1925–2022), 45th and 50th Mayor of Cheyenne, Wyoming

References

External links
 Western History Center near Lingle

Towns in Goshen County, Wyoming
Towns in Wyoming